The 1959 Mediterranean Games football tournament was the 3rd edition of the Mediterranean Games men's football tournament. The football tournament was held in Beirut, Lebanon between the 12–23 October 1959 as part of the 1959 Mediterranean Games.

Participating teams
The following countries have participated for the final tournament:

Venues

Squads

Final tournament
All times local : CET (UTC+2)

Matches

1st leg

2nd leg

Tournament classification

References 

1959
Sports at the 1959 Mediterranean Games
1959